Methoxyestradiol may refer to:

 2-Methoxyestradiol
 4-Methoxyestradiol
 11β-Methoxyestradiol